The Tauweru River, sometimes called the Taueru River, is a river in the Wairarapa region of New Zealand's North Island.  It drains from the pastoral eastern highlands of the Wairarapa and joins the Ruamahanga River just north of the Gladstone Road bridge into Gladstone, southeast of Carterton.  The river's name is Māori for "hanging in clusters" and named after it is the town of Tauweru, located along the middle reaches of the river east of Masterton.

The river itself is slow and sluggish, flowing in a willow-lined, restricted and gravel-less channel.  A group of local farmers, the Mid-Tauweru Landcare Group, was established in 2000 to facilitate sound management of the river's riparian zone by replacing willows with native plants to enhance the river's flow and biodiversity.  Its catchment east of Masterton is extensive and fishing conditions in the lower three kilometres of the river are considered to be excellent, especially in summer.

References 

Rivers of the Wellington Region
Rivers of New Zealand